Fama or FAMA may refer to:

People
 Eugene Fama (born 1939), American economist
 Mary Fama (1938–2021), New Zealand applied mathematician

Places
 Fama, Mali
 Fama, Minas Gerais

Music
 FAMA, Hong Kong hip hop duo
 Fama (band), a band originally from Houston, Texas

Organisations
  (FAMA), a defunct airline of Argentina, predecessor of Aerolíneas Argentinas
 Fama International, a collective or writers, artists, journalists from Sarajevo
 Forces Armées Maliennes (FAMa), the French name for the Malian Armed Forces

Other uses
 408 Fama, asteroid
 Fama IM, instant messaging
 Freshwater And Marine Aquarium, a consumer fishkeeping magazine
 Pheme (Greek) or Fama (Roman), personification of fame and renown
 HMS Fama, British navy ships

See also
 La Fama, Mexican TV series